Anders Theodor Samuel Nygren (15 November 1890, Gothenburg – 20 October 1978, Lund) was a Swedish Lutheran theologian. He was professor of systematic theology at Lund University from 1924 and was elected Bishop of Lund in 1948 (emeritus 1958). He is best known for his two-volume work Agape and Eros (first published as Eros and Agape in Swedish 1930–1936).

Nygren's approach, along with that of Gustaf Aulén, characterises what is referred to as “Lundensian Theology”.

Nygren's observations about love are discussed at length in M. C. D'Arcy's The Mind And Heart Of Love: Lion And Unicorn, A Study In Eros And Agape, Faber and Faber, 1945.

References
Jarlert, Anders : "Nygren, Anders", Svenskt biografiskt lexikon, vol. 27, pp. 692–698.

Further reading
 Lundensian Theology. Dictionary article by Wesley J. Wildman including a discussion of Nygren's thinking and biographical details.
 Thomas Jay Oord: The Nature of Love: A Theology. Chalice Press, 2010.

External links

 

20th-century Lutheran bishops
20th-century Protestant theologians
Christian ethicists
Knights Commander of the Order of Merit of the Federal Republic of Germany
Lutheran bishops of Lund
People from Gothenburg
Swedish theologians
1890 births
1978 deaths